The 2018 Northeast Conference baseball tournament began on May 24 and ended on May 27 at Senator Thomas J. Dodd Memorial Stadium in Norwich, Connecticut.  The league's top four teams finishers competed in the double elimination tournament.   won their first tournament championship and earned the Northeast Conference's automatic bid to the 2018 NCAA Division I baseball tournament.

Entering the event, Central Connecticut had won the most tournament championships among current members, while Fairleigh Dickinson and LIU Brooklyn had never won a championship.

Seeding and format
The top four finishers were seeded one through four based on conference regular season winning percentage.  They then played a double-elimination tournament.

Bracket

All-Tournament Team
The following players were named to the All-Tournament Team.

Most Valuable Player
Gregory Vaughn Jr. earned the Tournament Most Valuable Player award.  Vaughn was a junior outfielder for LIU Brooklyn, who recorded 5 RBI and 3 stolen bases in the Tournament.

References

Tournament
Northeast Conference Baseball Tournament
Northeast Conference baseball tournament
Northeast Conference baseball tournament